David Evanier is an American author. He is working on a biography of Morton Sobell.

Thomas Mallon wrote in Newsday that Evanier's Red Love is "an irreverent novel about the case of Julius Rosenberg and Ethel Rosenberg" that was likely to "be greeted with howls of anger in all the predictable places. The Nation will be appalled, the Village Voice revolted."

Bibliography
The One-Star Jew (North Point Press, 1983)
Red Love (Scribner's, 1991)
Making the Wiseguys Weep : The Jimmy Roselli Story (Farrar, Straus, and Giroux, 1998)
The Great Kisser (Rager, 2007)
Woody: The Biography (St. Martin's Press, 2015)

References

External links
 Website

Jewish American writers
American biographers
20th-century American novelists
21st-century American novelists
Living people
Year of birth missing (living people)
21st-century American Jews